Xu Bing (1903 – 1972) was a Chinese male politician, who served as the vice chairperson of the Chinese People's Political Consultative Conference.

References 

1903 births
1972 deaths
Vice Chairpersons of the National Committee of the Chinese People's Political Consultative Conference